Dužice may refer to:
 Dužice, Široki Brijeg, Bosnia and Herzegovina
 Dužice, Montenegro